2002 MN is the provisional designation given to a 73-meter Apollo near-Earth asteroid that on 14 June 2002 passed Earth at a distance of , about one third the distance to the Moon (0.3 LD). The close approach was second only to the Earth approach by the 10-meter asteroid 1994 XM1. 2002 MN was discovered on 17 June 2002, three days after closest approach. There is a cumulative 1 in 360,000 chance that the asteroid could impact Earth sometime after 2070.

Notes

References

External links 
 
 
 

Minor planet object articles (unnumbered)
Potential impact events caused by near-Earth objects
20020614
20020617